Rosario Tijeras is a Spanish-language telenovela produced by Teleset for Sony Pictures Television and TV Azteca.

Series overview

Episodes

Season 1 (2016–17)

Season 2 (2018)

Season 3 (2019)

References 

Lists of Mexican drama television series episodes
Lists of soap opera episodes